Bano Traoré (born 25 April 1985 in Ivry-sur-Seine, France) is a Malian athlete who specialises in the 110 meter hurdles. Traoré initially represented his birth country, France. He competed at the 2007 World Athletics Championships and the 2007 European Athletics Indoor Championships.

He later began competing for Mali, where his parents come from.

Competition record

See also
 Sub-Saharan African community of Paris

References

External links
 www.iaaf.org Bano Traoré

1985 births
Living people
People from Ivry-sur-Seine
French male hurdlers
French people of Malian descent
Malian male hurdlers
World Athletics Championships athletes for Mali
World Athletics Championships athletes for France
Athletes (track and field) at the 2015 African Games
Sportspeople from Val-de-Marne
African Games competitors for Mali